This is a list of notable inhabitants of Sydney, New South Wales, Australia.

Arts and entertainment

Musical groups

Politics

Science

Sports 

 Mangok Mathiang (born 1992), Australian-Sudanese basketball player for Hapoel Eilat of the Israeli Basketball Premier League

Other

See also 

 Lists of Australians

References 

Sydney
Sydney

Residents